EBIC may refer to:

 Electron beam-induced current, a semiconductor analysis technique 
 Electronic Banking Internet Communication Standard, a transmission protocol for banking information